Mohamed Baghdadi (born 13 June 1974) is a Tunisian volleyball player. He competed in the men's tournament at the 1996 Summer Olympics.

References

1974 births
Living people
Tunisian men's volleyball players
Olympic volleyball players of Tunisia
Volleyball players at the 1996 Summer Olympics
Place of birth missing (living people)